James Obuya Smart is a Kenyan Journalist and news anchor currently working for Nation Television Networks. He has worked for other major networks like Capital FM Kenya and KTN. He pioneered the popular show on NTV called ‘The Trend’. After he left NTV, Larry Madowo took over.

Early life and education 
James Smart grew up in Korogocho Slums.
He went to St Paul's Lugari  High School. He holds an MA in International Journalism from Cardiff University

Career 
James, initially worked as a sports journalist at Capital FM Kenya before moving to television as a news anchor and reporter at NTV (Kenya). Most recently, he has collaborated with the BBC to create its "Focus on Africa" broadcast, a flagship TV news program that highlights stories from across the African continent. 

He is now at KTN and he hosts a show alongside Dennis Onsarigo called News Sources.

Personal life 
He is married and has a son.

References

External links 
 James Smart Official Website

Living people
Kenyan television journalists
Year of birth missing (living people)